Endiandra impressicosta is a species of tree in the family Lauraceae. Found in tropical rainforest in Queensland in Australia, also in Papua New Guinea. This species may grow to 25 metres tall.

References 

impressicosta
Plants described in 1942
Flora of Queensland
Flora of New Guinea